Fernandoa lutea is a species of plant in the family Bignoniaceae. It is endemic to Tanzania.  It is threatened by habitat loss.

References

lutea
Flora of Tanzania
Taxonomy articles created by Polbot

Critically endangered flora of Africa